SKB-Bank Arena, originally called Uralmash Stadium, is a multi-use stadium in Yekaterinburg, Russia.  It is currently used mostly for football matches and is the home ground of FC Ural Sverdlovsk Oblast also known as FC Ural Yekaterinburg. The stadium holds 10,000 people.

External links 
 Uralmash Stadium 

Football venues in Russia
FC Ural Yekaterinburg